Alexander Alberto Cabrera (born December 24, 1971) is a Venezuelan first baseman and right-handed batter who played in 2000 for the Arizona Diamondbacks of Major League Baseball and for 12 seasons in Nippon Professional Baseball. Also played several seasons in the LVBP in his native Venezuela.

Career

He was signed by the Chicago Cubs as an amateur free agent in 1991, and moved to the Tampa Bay Devil Rays organization before the 1998 season. He  played for CPBL's Koos Group Whales in 1999, and then signed with the Arizona Diamondbacks in 2000.

After toiling in the minors for nine seasons, Cabrera finally got a shot in the majors with the Diamondbacks. A muscular slugger (6' 2", 220 lb.), Cabrera hit a home run during his first at-bat. He ended the 2000 MLB season with a .262 average, five home runs, 14 RBI, 10 runs, two doubles, one triple and a .500 slugging percentage in 31 games.

After the 2000 season, the Seibu Lions of the Japan Pacific League purchased his contract from Arizona.

In 2001, Cabrera batted .282, with 49 home runs and 124 RBI. He was even better in 2002, with a .336, 55, 115 batting line, winning the Pacific League's MVP award. His 55 home runs tied Japan's single-season record, equaling the mark set by the legendary Sadaharu Oh in 1964 and matched by former big leaguer Tuffy Rhodes in 2001. (In 2013, Wladimir Balentien, playing for the Yakult Swallows, established a new record with 60 home runs.)

In 2003, Cabrera hit an impressive 50 home runs and produced 112 RBIs, while batting .324 for Seibu. Injuries limited him to 64 games in 2004, with 25 home runs and 62 RBIs.

On October 26, 2004, Cabrera hit a two-run towering homer as the Seibu Lions defeated the Chunichi Dragons 7–2 in Game 7 of the Japan Series to win their first championship since 1992. The ball bounced off the glass-enclosed private boxes above the left field seats at the Nagoya Dome. It was Cabrera's third home run of the series. He also hit a grand slam and a two-run homer in Game 3.

In six seasons with the Lions, Cabrera was a .308 hitter with 246 home runs and 605 RBI in 708 games.

In January 2008, Cabrera signed a one-year contract with the Orix Buffaloes. It was reported that the contract had a requirement that Cabrera pass a drug test when he reported in February. He obtained free agency rights following the 2009 season after playing 8 years in Japan, thereby removing the designation as a "foreign player," becoming the fourth non-Japanese player to obtain such classification in NPB.

In three seasons with Orix (2008–10), Cabrera slugged a combined 73 home runs and produced 225 RBIs.

After his career in Japan came to a close with just 97 games played in 2011-12 with the Fukuoka SoftBank Hawks, Cabrera continued to play professional baseball during the winter season for Tiburones de La Guaira in his native Venezuela. In 59 games during the 2013-14 season, Cabrera batted .391, with a record-setting 21 home runs. He broke the league single season home run record set by Baudilio Diaz, who hit 20 in 1979-80.

Mitchell Report
On December 13, 2007, Cabrera was linked to steroid use in the Mitchell Report, one of many MLB players so identified. The report detailed an incident in September 2000 when Cabrera was playing for the Arizona Diamondbacks. Team officials found a package that contained a vial of what they suspected to be anabolic steroids and several hundred pills. Clubhouse attendants claimed the package was intended for Cabrera. The contents of the package were tested and it was determined that the vial contained the anabolic steroid Winstrol, but the pills were legal, over-the-counter diet pills. Before the tests came back, however, Cabrera's contract had been sold to the Seibu Lions, so he was never tested for steroid use. Cabrera denied knowing why the package had been addressed to him

After the report came out, Cabrera denied ever using steroids."I couldn't have used the substances that are identified. I never had possession of the alleged box that supposedly contained the pharmaceutical drugs."

During his career in Japan, Cabrera never tested positive for performance-enhancing drugs.

Personal life
Cabrera's son Ramón is also a professional baseball player. The younger Cabrera, a switch-hitting catcher, signed his first pro contract with the Pittsburgh Pirates organization in 2008, at the age of 18. Ramon made his major league debut with the Cincinnati Reds on September 5, 2015.

See also
 List of Major League Baseball players from Venezuela
 List of Major League Baseball players named in the Mitchell Report

References

External links

The Baseball Guru Japanese Baseball Data Archive

1971 births
Living people
Arizona Diamondbacks players
Arizona League Diamondbacks players
Bakersfield Blaze players
Daytona Cubs players
El Paso Diablos players
Fukuoka SoftBank Hawks players
Geneva Cubs players
Koos Group Whales players
Leones del Caracas players
Major League Baseball first basemen
Major League Baseball players from Venezuela
Mexican League baseball first basemen
Nippon Professional Baseball designated hitters
Nippon Professional Baseball first basemen
Nippon Professional Baseball MVP Award winners
Orix Buffaloes players
Pastora de los Llanos players
Pastora de Occidente players
People from Monagas
Peoria Chiefs players
Rojos del Águila de Veracruz players
Seibu Lions players
Tiburones de La Guaira players
Tucson Sidewinders players
Venezuelan expatriate baseball players in Japan
Venezuelan expatriate baseball players in Mexico
Venezuelan expatriate baseball players in Taiwan
Venezuelan expatriate baseball players in the United States
Venezuelan people of Japanese descent